{{infobox football derby
| name                     = Lincolnshire Derby
| other names              = Lincs Derby
| image                    = Lincolnshire flag
| caption                  = 
| city or region           = Lincolnshire
| first contested          = 3 January 1884Grimsby Town vs. Lincoln City 11 December 1886Lincoln City vs. Gainsborough Trinity 25 December 1951Grimsby Town vs. Scunthorpe United  23 August 1950 Lincoln City v Scunthorpe United 27 December 1993 Boston United v Gainsborough Trinity  10 August 2004 Grimsby Town v Boston United  5 September 1896Grimsby Town v Gainsborough Trinity  29 November 1930Gainsborough Trinity v Scunthorpe United  22 November 1975 Lincoln City v Boston United  21 November 1953 Scunthorpe United v Boston United
| teams involved           = Boston United, Gainsborough Trinity, Grimsby Town, Lincoln City, Scunthorpe United
| most wins                = Grimsby Town (85)
| most player appearances  = 
| mostrecent               = 23 January 2021  Scunthorpe United 3–0 Grimsby Town
| nextmeeting              = 
| total                    = 
| league                   = 
| series                   = 
| regularseason            = 
| postseason               = 
| largestvictory           = 21 November 1953  Scunthorpe United 9–0 Boston United
}}
The Lincolnshire Derby, also known as the Lincs Derby, is the footballing rivalry between the teams in the ceremonial county of Lincolnshire, England: Lincoln City, Boston United, Gainsborough Trinity, Grimsby Town and Scunthorpe United.

Games between the clubs are known as a "Lincolnshire Derby", however games between former Humberside based sides Grimsby Town and Scunthorpe United are usually counted as a Humber Derby.

History

The derby was contested on 3 January 1884 when Grimsby Town played Lincoln City at Clee Park in Grimsby. Grimsby won the game 1–0. Scunthorpe United's first game was a 1–0 away defeat to Gainsborough Trinity in 1930. Trinity debuted themselves in 1886 against Lincoln City in a 2–2 draw in the FA Cup. Boston United debuted in 1953 with a 9–0 defeat against Scunthorpe United, which is the record score from a Lincolnshire derby.

In recent years the derby has tended to be between Grimsby Town and Lincoln City, due to them both playing in Football League Two and the Conference National and Gainsborough Trinity versus Boston United in the Conference North. Grimsby and Lincoln have faced each other in tiers 2 to 5 of the English football league system, making this rivalry the most enduring.

Games between Grimsby Town and Scunthorpe United are also called and noted as the Humber Derby, which is a separate local rivalry shared between themselves and Hull City from the north bank of the Humber Estuary. Other Lincolnshire clubs also have minor derbys which are contested between the likes of Grantham Town, Spalding United, Lincoln United, Sleaford Town, Holbeach United, Boston Town, Stamford, Grimsby Borough, Louth Town, Bourne Town, Lincoln Moorlands Railway, Skegness Town, Cleethorpes Town and Nettleham, but all clubs play in divisions lower than the 6th tier of English football. In addition the five original teams are the only teams from the county who have ever played in the Football League.

Games played in the pre-season tournament the Lincolnshire Senior Cup do not count as Lincs derby as games in the competition are not viewed as competitive fixtures.

The most recent derby took place on 1 January 2018 with Gainsborough Trinity holding Boston United to a 1–1 draw at The Northolme, Gainsborough.

Statistics and facts

Facts
Most successful team in a Lincolnshire derby: Grimsby Town (85 wins)
Most goals scored in Lincolnshire derbys: Grimsby Town (325 goals)
Most goals conceded in Lincolnshire derbys: Lincoln City (350 goals)
Most successful team from Lincolnshire: Grimsby Town (7 league titles, 1 domestic cup victory, 39 pre-season cup victories)
Largest victory in a Lincolnshire derby: Scunthorpe United 9–0 Boston United (21 November 1953)
Oldest team in Lincolnshire: Gainsborough Trinity (1873)
Least successful team in a Lincolnshire derby: Boston United (15 wins)
Club with most time spent in top tier of English football: Grimsby Town (12 seasons)
Club with most time spent in second tier of English football: Grimsby Town (49 seasons)
First club to play at Wembley Stadium: Brigg Town (1985)
Team with most appearances at Wembley Stadium: Grimsby Town (7 times)
Team with most appearances at the Millennium Stadium: Lincoln City (2 times)
Largest attendance in Lincolnshire: 31,651, Grimsby Town v Wolverhampton Wanderers (FA Cup, 20 February 1937)
Most successful team in the FA Cup: Grimsby Town (two semi-final appearances)
Most successful team in the League Cup: Grimsby Town (Round 6)
Most successful team in the Football League Trophy: Grimsby Town (winners, once in 1998) And Lincoln City (winners, once in 2018)
Most successful team in the Lincolnshire Senior Cup: Grimsby Town and Lincoln City (winners, 38 times)

Goals scoredStatistics up-to-date as of 19 January 2019Goals concededStatistics up-to-date as of 19 January 2019Total resultsStatistics up-to-date as of 21 December 2019''
Grimsby Town vs. Lincoln City

Grimsby Town vs. Scunthorpe United

Lincoln City vs. Scunthorpe United

Boston United vs. Gainsborough Trinity

Lincoln City vs. Gainsborough Trinity

Grimsby Town vs. Gainsborough Trinity

Scunthorpe United vs. Gainsborough Trinity

Boston United vs. Lincoln City

Scunthorpe United vs. Boston United

Boston United vs. Grimsby Town

Club ladder
Below is a list of all notable football clubs in the ceremonial county of Lincolnshire. The ladder is in order of what division clubs are in to what level. The current tier indicates what level the club compete at in the English football league system, the Highest tier box represents the highest tier that club has played their football at. The list also includes defunct clubs.

Last 20 meetings

Crossing the divide
The following lists include players who have made appearances for both Lincolnshire sides. If a player has been signed for both clubs but failed to play for both as in the case of Joby Gowshall or Andy Smith for Lincoln City and Grimsby Town then they are not included. If a player has played for one, but failed to make an appearance for the other, then he is included. Players do not necessarily have to have played in a Lincolnshire derby to be included in this section.

Grimsby Town and Lincoln City

Grimsby Town and Scunthorpe United

References 

England football derbies
Football in Lincolnshire
Boston United F.C.
Gainsborough Trinity F.C.
Grantham Town F.C.
Grimsby Town F.C.
Lincoln City F.C.
Scunthorpe United F.C.
1884 establishments in England